Lopushna is a village in Lviv Raion, Lviv Oblast in western Ukraine. Lopushna belongs to Bibrka urban hromada, one of the hromadas of Ukraine.  
Area of the village totals 2,04 km2, and the population of the village is just about 282 people. Local government is administered by Sukhodilska village council.

History and Attractions 
The first known written reference about the village Lopushna is date to 1508.

Until 18 July 2020, Lopushna belonged to Peremyshliany Raion. The raion was abolished in July 2020 as part of the administrative reform of Ukraine, which reduced the number of raions of Lviv Oblast to seven. The area of Peremyshliany Raion was merged into Lviv Raion.

The village has an architectural monument of local importance of Peremyshliany Raion – of Resurrection of Christ Church that was built in 1924 (2338-М).

References

External links 
 weather.in.ua
 Лопушна, Церква Воскресіння Господнього 1924

Literature 
  Page 573

Villages in Lviv Raion